Polythene is the debut studio album by Welsh  rock band Feeder. It was released 19 May 1997 on the Echo Label, and then re-issued on 28 October in the same year in an Enhanced CD version, featuring their UK top 40 breakthrough single "High" and its video. The original version of the album was deleted soon after and is relatively rare due to this reason.

Despite sizeable critical success, the album had minor commercial success, charting at number 65 in the UK albums chart. However, Polythene would later achieve Gold record status despite never having appeared in the top 50 of the album charts, a rare feat reflecting steady and consistent sales over a period of 20 years, rather than strong initial sales.

The album saw the group's early take on a more grunge-influenced sound, which was not seen on their other albums that followed. Many critics at the time called the band the UK's answer to the Smashing Pumpkins.

In April 1998, a VHS compilation of the music videos for the album's singles was released, titled Polythene: The Video Singles.

Background
Polythene'''s working title was Here in the Bubble.

Prior to the release of Polythene, Feeder had released several singles, which helped them build a cult following.

The album carries over two tracks – "Descend" and "Stereo World" – from Feeder's earlier EP, Swim.

Reception

The band's second single off Polythene, "Cement" was given a 5/5 review rating by Kerrang!, and their "Single of the Week" accolade. The album itself was ranked 6th in the magazine's best albums of the year chart. Metal Hammer voted it the best album of 1997 in its end of year critic's poll.Kerrang! later included Polythene in their 200 Albums For the Year 2000 list in the "Essential Britrock" category. It appeared at number 87 in an early 2005 Kerrang!'' magazine vote, ranking the top 100 British rock albums of all-time.

Accolades

Track listing
total 46:30
 total 51:04
total 57:57
 The album was reissued on 20 October 1997 with Polythene Girl being replaced with a remix by Chris Sheldon, non album single "High" was added to the track listing as track 4 and Waterfall was removed and replaced by Change as track 10 between "Stereo World" and "Tangerine"

Personnel
Feeder
Grant Nicholas- vocals, guitar, production on "Polythene Girl", "My Perfect Day" and "Crash", concept, photography
Taka Hirose- bass guitar
Jon Lee- drums

Production
Chris Sheldon - production, mixing, engineering
Feeder - production on "Cement"
Brian Sperber - production, engineering and mixing on "Polythene Girl", "My Perfect Day" and "Crash", remix on "Cement"
Audrey Riley - string arrangements on "High"
Matt Sime - engineering, mixing on "High"
Steve Power - mixing, additional engineering on "High"
Howie Weinberg - mastering

Artwork
Jeremy Plumb - concept, design
Scarlet Page - photography
Dan McLewin - photography
Andrew Cameron - photography

References

1997 debut albums
Feeder albums
The Echo Label albums
Albums produced by Chris Sheldon